Barbara Murrey (19 May 1924 – August 2004), also known by her married name Barbara Sharrock, was an English cricketer who played as a right-handed batter. She appeared in 6 Test matches for England between 1951 and 1954. She mainly played domestic cricket for Surrey.

References

External links
 
 

1924 births
2004 deaths
Cricketers from Epsom
England women Test cricketers
Surrey women cricketers